The Seram imperial pigeon (Ducula neglecta) is a species of bird in the family Columbidae.
It is endemic to Indonesia where it is found on Seram and Ambon Islands in the Moluccas.

Its natural habitats are subtropical or tropical moist lowland forests and subtropical or tropical mangrove forests.

References

Seram imperial pigeon
Birds of Seram
Endemic fauna of Seram Island
Seram imperial pigeon